Yang Yeon-je (born Yang Hye-sun []; October 15, 1999), also known by her stage name Yeonje and formerly Hyeseong, is a South Korean singer, dancer and musical actress under IOK Company. She debuted as a member of Alice (then known as Elris) in 2017 under the stage name Hyeseong. She debuted as musical actress in the musical "Hello Jadoo" as Lee Eunhee in 2018.

Early life 
Yeonje was born as Yang Hye-sun on October 15, 1999, in Gwangju, South Korea. Her family consists of herself, her parents and one younger sister. Yeonje studied at Hanlim Multi Art School.

History

Pre-debut 
Yeonje appeared on Romeo's music video "TARGET" on November 4, 2015. She also appeared in a chicken CF with IU.

2017–present: Debut with Alice, Musical Theater Debut, OST 
On June 1, 2017, Yeonje officially debuted with Elris with the release of their 1st mini album We, First. In September 2017, Yeonje auditioned for JTBC's reality show Mix Nine; she passed the audition stage making it onto the show. Yeonje was eliminated in ep 10, ranking 43 out of the girls ranking.

In June 2018, Yeonje was cast in the musical "Hello Jadoo" as Lee Eunhee. On June 2, 2018, Yeonje released the OST "Single Heart" for the drama "Rich Man" with groupmate Do-A.

On April 11, 2022, after Elris rebranded to Alice, she changed her stage name from Hyeseong to Yeonje.

Discography

Singles

Filmography

Variety shows

Television shows

Musicals

References

External links

1999 births
Living people
People from Gwangju
K-pop singers
South Korean women pop singers
South Korean contemporary R&B singers
South Korean dance musicians
South Korean female idols
21st-century South Korean singers
21st-century South Korean women singers
Hanlim Multi Art School alumni